Rafael Silva de Araújo (born November 16, 1984, in Vitória de Santo Antão), known as Rafael Araújo, is a Brazilian footballer who plays for Treze as defender.

Career statistics

References

External links

1984 births
Living people
Brazilian footballers
Association football defenders
Campeonato Brasileiro Série C players
Campeonato Brasileiro Série D players
Caiçara Esporte Clube players
Alecrim Futebol Clube players
Nacional Atlético Clube (Patos) players
Associação Atlética Coruripe players
Centro Sportivo Alagoano players
Esporte Clube Flamengo players
Grêmio Barueri Futebol players
Itumbiara Esporte Clube players
Treze Futebol Clube players
Salgueiro Atlético Clube players
Campinense Clube players
Central Sport Club players